Field of Mars Parish is one of the 57 parishes of Cumberland County, New South Wales, a cadastral unit for use on land titles. While the name is mostly forgotten as a region name today, it has given the name to the modern suburb of Marsfield and the reserve in the area. It is centred on Carlingford and also includes Epping, Telopea and Ermington. Its southern boundary is the Parramatta River.

External links

Parishes of Cumberland County